Kirkland is an unincorporated community in Lincoln County, Tennessee, United States.

References

Unincorporated communities in Lincoln County, Tennessee
Unincorporated communities in Tennessee